The OVW Kentucky Heavyweight Championship is a professional wrestling heavyweight championship created and promoted by the Ohio Valley Wrestling (OVW) promotion.  The current holder is Ryan Von Rockit who is in his first reign.

Inaugural Championship Tournament bracket

Title history 
Luscious Lawrence was the inaugural champion. Lawrence's reign is the longest at 156 days, while Matt Vine’s reign is the shortest at 16 days.

Ryan Von Rockit is the current champion in his first reign. He defeated previous champion Jack Vaughn and Doug Basham in a three-way match on Christmas Chaos on December 13, 2022, in Louisville, KY.

References

External links
OVW Kentucky Heavyweight Title History at Cagematch.net

Ohio Valley Wrestling championships
State professional wrestling championships
Heavyweight wrestling championships